Mount Cuadrado, also known as Mount Quadrado and Mount Quebrado, is a mountain peak located in the Cabusilan Mountains. Aheading northwest, the part of the Philippines is Manila, approximately 80 kilometers away from the mountain. Mount Cuadrado belongs to the Cabusilan sub-range together with Mount Negron, Mount Mataba and Mount Pinatubo.

Climate 
The average temperature in 23 °C (73 °F) per year, the warmest month is April, at 25 °C (77 °F), and the coldest month is December, at 22 °C (71 °F). The wettest month is August, with 1,071 millimeters of rain.

References

Mountains of the Philippines